Kings XI Punjab (KXIP) is a franchise cricket team based in Mohali, India, which plays in the Indian Premier League (IPL). They were one of the eight teams that competed in the 2015 Indian Premier League. They were captained by George Bailey. Kings XI Punjab finished last in the IPL and did not qualify for the Champions League T20.

Indian Premier League

Season standings
Kings XI Punjab finished last in the league stage of IPL 2015.

Match log

References

Punjab Kings seasons
2015 Indian Premier League